Andrew C. Erin is a Canadian-born American film director. Erin is best known for his film Sam's Lake, starring Sandrine Holt. Sam's Lake is a thriller/horror film released in 2006.

Sam's Lake marks Andrew C. Erin's feature debut following six years of writing, directing, and producing Canadian TV pilots, series, and short films. Following Sam's Lake, which was produced by Mirovision/Maverick Films, Erin wrote and directed his second feature, Simple Things, a drama set in North Carolina. In 2008 he co-wrote and directed Toxic Skies.

Filmography
Sam's Lake (2006)
Simple Things (2007)
Toxic Skies (2008)
Tornado Valley (TV movie, 2009)
Confined (2010)
A Borrowed Life (2011)
Final Sale (2011)
Borderline Murder (TV movie, 2011)
Playdate (TV movie, 2012)
Havenhurst (2016)

References

External links
 
 MySpace

Living people
American film directors
American film producers
Canadian emigrants to the United States
Year of birth missing (living people)